Noel is the surname of the following:

Bill Noël (1914–1987), Texas oil industrialist and philanthropist
Christian Noël (born 1945), French fencer
Claude Noël (born 1955), Canadian hockey player and coach
David Noel (born 1984), American basketball player
Edmond Noel, governor of Mississippi
Edward Noel (Indian Army officer), British soldier and spy
Ellen Kyle Noel (1815–1873), Irish Canadian novelist
Evan Noel (1879–1928), British rackets player
Fabrice Noël (born 1985), Haitian football player
Fania Noël, Franco-Haitian author and activist
Gerard Noel (disambiguation), several people
Iván Noel (1968–2021), Argentinian producer and director
Jimmy Noel (1903–1985), American actor and stuntman
John Noel (disambiguation), several people
Jules Achille Noël (born 1815), French landscape and maritime painter
Magali Noël (born 1932), Turkish-French actress and singer
Nerlens Noel (born 1994), American basketball player
Paul Noel (1924–2005), American basketball player
Philip W. Noel (born 1931), 68th Governor of Rhode Island
Rico Noel (born 1989), American baseball player
Roden Noel (1834–1894), English poet
Paul Noel (1954–present), English football player who played in Hong Kong, was known being incorrect in many different ways
Sofía Noel, adopted name of the Belgian-born Spanish soprano Sophie Heyman (1915–2011)

Fictional
Tessa Noël, character in the television series Highlander: The Series

See also
Nowell (surname)
Noll, surname
Knoll (surname)
Knowle (disambiguation), includes list of people with surname Knowle

Surnames from nicknames